Marilyn Moore (born November 13, 1948) is an American politician who has served in the Connecticut State Senate from the 22nd district since 2015.

References

1948 births
Living people
Democratic Party Connecticut state senators
21st-century American politicians
21st-century American women politicians
Politicians from Bridgeport, Connecticut
African-American people in Connecticut politics
Women in Connecticut politics
21st-century African-American women
21st-century African-American politicians
20th-century African-American people
20th-century African-American women